MikroMikko was a Finnish line of microcomputers released by Nokia Corporation's computer division Nokia Data from 1981 through 1987. MikroMikko was Nokia Data's attempt to enter the business computer market. They were especially designed for good ergonomy.

History
The first model in the line, MikroMikko 1, was released on 29 September 1981, 48 days after IBM introduced its Personal Computer. The launch date of MikroMikko 1 is the name day of Mikko in the Finnish almanac. The MikroMikko line was manufactured in a factory in the Kilo district of Espoo, Finland, where computers had been produced since the 1960s. Nokia later bought the computer division of the Swedish telecommunications company Ericsson.

During Finland's economic depression in the early 1990s, Nokia streamlined many of its operations and sold many of its less profitable divisions to concentrate on its key competence of telecommunications. Nokia's personal computer division was sold to the British computer company ICL (International Computers Limited) in 1991, which later became part of Fujitsu. However, ICL and later Fujitsu retained the MikroMikko trademark in Finland. Internationally the MikroMikko line was marketed by Fujitsu under the trademark ErgoPro.

Fujitsu later transferred its personal computer operations to Fujitsu Siemens Computers, which shut down its only factory in Espoo at the end of March 2000, thus ending large-scale PC manufacturing in the country.

Models

MikroMikko 1 M6
 Processor: Intel 8085, 2 MHz
 64 KB RAM, 4 KB ROM
 Display: 80×24 character text mode, the 25th row was used as a status row. Graphics resolutions 160×75 and 800×375 pixels, refresh rate 50 Hz
 Two 640 KB 5.25" floppy drives (other models might only have one drive)
 Optional 5 MB hard disk (stock in model M7)
 Connectors: two RS-232s, display, printer, keyboard
 Software: Nokia CP/M 2.2 operating system, Microsoft BASIC, editor, assembler and debugger
 Cost: 30,000 mk in 1984

MikroMikko 2
 Released in 1983
 Processor: Intel 80186
 Partly MS-DOS compatible, used Nokia's own version of MS-DOS 2.x

MikroMikko 3
 Released in 1986
 PC/AT compatible
 Processor: 6 or 8 MHz Intel 80286
 Hercules monitor
 Six extension card slots
 Mouse
 Cost: 47,950 mk

MikroMikko 3 TT
 Team workstation, released in spring 1987
 Processor: 8 MHz Intel 80286
 1 MB RAM
 Two extension card slots
 One or two 3.5" 720 KB floppy drives
 Optional 20 MB hard disk
 MS-DOS 3.2 operating system
 Cost: with one floppy drive 21,500 mk, two drives 23,000 mk, one floppy drive and 20 MB hard disk 25,900 mk

MikroMikko 3 TT M125
 Processor: 33 MHz Intel 80386DX
 4 MB RAM
 1.44 MB 3.5" floppy drive
 40 MB hard disk
 Connectors: display, keyboard, mouse, RS-232 serial port, Centronics printer port
 Software: MS-DOS 5.0 operating system

Laptop computers
 MikroMikko 4m310
 MikroMikko N3/25x

Tiimi workgroup system
The "Tiimi" workgroup system was a local area network consisting of MikroMikko workstations and servers, popular in the late 1980s. The servers were MPS-10s or MikroMikko models 2 and 3. The workstations were MikroMikko 3TT and PääteMikko computers. At least SQL/DMS database software and NOSS document manager software was available.

References

External links
Old-Computers.com – MikroMikko page

Nokia
Desktop computers
Home computers
Computer-related introductions in 1981